Aleksandr Ruslanovich Kanishchev (born 16 January 1998) is a Russian football player. He plays for FC Salyut Belgorod.

Club career
He made his debut in the Russian Professional Football League for FC Chertanovo Moscow on 21 September 2015 in a game against FC Vityaz Podolsk. He made his Russian Football National League debut for Chertanovo on 10 November 2018 in a game against FC Armavir.

References

External links
 
 
  

1998 births
People from Belgorod
Living people
Russian footballers
Russia youth international footballers
Association football midfielders
FC Chertanovo Moscow players
FC Salyut Belgorod players
Sportspeople from Belgorod Oblast